Nils Per Erik Sjöstrand (29 June 1930, Stockholm – 25 October 2008, Viken) was a Swedish actor, script writer and director.

Partial filmography 
Jens Mansson in America (1947) - Policeman (uncredited)
Trots (1952) - Student (uncredited)
 Unmarried Mothers (1953) - Erik Eliasson
 The Shadow (1953) - Press Photographer
 Café Lunchrasten (1954) - Arty student (uncredited)
 Violence (1955) - Sjunnesson
Kärlek på turné (1955) - Teddy
 Stage Entrance (1956) - Sven, acting student
Wild Strawberries (1957) - Sigfrid Borg
 The Jazz Boy (1958) - Armand i 'Kameliadamen'
Fröken Chic (1959) - Stage Manager (uncredited)
Who Saw Him Die? (1968) - Headmaster
The Touch (1971) - Therapist (uncredited)
Agaton Sax och Byköpings gästabud (1976) - Mosca / McSnuff (voice)
Bluff Stop (1977) - Journalist
Mio in the Land of Faraway (1987) - Eno / Carpetbeater (Swedish version, voice)
Four Days that shook Sweden - The Midsummer Crisis 1941 (1988, TV Movie documentary) - Gösta Bagge
Där regnbågen slutar (1999) - Bankdirektören (final fim role)

References

Swedish male writers
Swedish film directors
Male actors from Stockholm
1930 births
2008 deaths
20th-century Swedish screenwriters
20th-century Swedish male writers